A state of emergency occurs when any level of government assumes authority it does not generally possess to respond to a crisis. This is done by invoking said authority under specific legislation, and permits the government to expend funds, mobilize forces, or suspend civil liberties.

Declarations

Federal 
The Canadian government has declared a state of emergency four times, three in the 20th century and under the authority of the War Measures Act and one under the Emergencies Act. Under the War Measures, the three declared were:
 Ukrainian Canadian internment, 1914-1920
 Internment of Japanese Canadians and Internment of Italian Canadians, 1940-1949
 October Crisis, 1970
In 1988, Parliament replaced the War Measures Act with the Emergencies Act, which extended the powers beyond war applications. The sole application has been:

 Canada convoy protest, 2022

Provincial and territorial 
Historically, states of emergency have been declared by provinces for internal issues. Save for the 2004 White Juan Blizzard, until 2020 there had never been a situation where multiple provinces made a province wide declaration. This changed during the COVID-19 pandemic where every province and territory made the declaration, opposing similar measures from the federal government. Every province has the ability to assume emergency powers under either a specific emergency act or under a public health act. In some provinces, like British Columbia, both exist and can grant specific authorities. British Columbia's Civil Defence Act was enacted in 1951 and renamed the Emergency Program Act in 1973.

Notes

References 

Emergency laws
Disasters in Canada